Gongylus pauperatus is an praying mantis in the family Empusidae. Its generic name Gongylus means "roundish" in Greek.

Distribution
This species is found in the Mediterranean region of France.

References

Empusidae